Hepatosplenomegaly (commonly abbreviated HSM) is the simultaneous enlargement of both the liver (hepatomegaly) and the spleen (splenomegaly).  Hepatosplenomegaly can occur as the result of acute viral hepatitis, infectious mononucleosis, and histoplasmosis or it can be the sign of a serious and life-threatening lysosomal storage disease.  Systemic venous hypertension can also increase the risk for developing hepatosplenomegaly, which may be seen in those patients with right-sided heart failure.

Common causes

Rare disorders
 Lipoproteinlipase deficiency
 Multiple sulfatase deficiency
 Osteopetrosis
 Adult-onset Still's disease (AOSD)

References

External links 

Symptoms and signs: Digestive system and abdomen
Medical signs
Diseases of liver